Yuyutsu  in the Hindu epic Mahabharata was a son of Dhritarashtra with Gandhari's maid (named Sughada in later retelling). He was the paternal half - sibling to Gandhari's children: Duryodhana and the rest of the 99 Kaurava brothers and their sister Dushala. Eventually, he was the only son of Dhritarashtra who survived the Kurukshetra war. He was the only son of Dhritarashtra to fight for Pandavas.

Etymology

The word yuyutsu is an adjective formed from the desiderative stem of the verb root "yudh" (fight, wage war), meaning "wishing to fight, bellicose." The Mahabharata cites the following other names for Yuyutsu- 

 Dhārtarāstra (धार्तराष्ट्र) - son of Dhritarashtra
 Kauravya (कौरव्य) - descendant of Kuru
 Vaishyaputra (वैश्यपुत्र) - son of a Vaishya woman
 Karana (करण) - begotten by a Kshatriya on a Vaisya woman

Birth
Yuyutsu was a son of Dhritarashtra and Sughada. Yuyutsu was born after Duryodhana  and before Dushasana, other 99 Kauravas brothers and Dussala. Thus, Dhritarashtra had 102 children (101 sons and 1 daughter).

Righteous in the Kaurava camp
Yuyutsu is celebrated as a moral warrior who chose the path of righteousness, in spite of being born in circumstances that predisposed him to evil. He forwent his family bonds in order to side with dharma.

As the war was about to begin, Yudhishthira made an announcement in the battlefield, saying anybody who wishes to change sides can do it now, before conches are blown. It is at this moment that Yuyutsu changed sides and took the side of righteousness.

Also, Yuyutsu saved the life of Bhima by informing the Pandavas about Duryodhana's cunning schemes, which included poisoning water. Both Yuyutsu and Vikarna abhorred Duryodhana's conspiracies and evil schemes; however, Vikarna stays loyal to the family and perishes in the war. Yuyutsu shifts from Kaurava camp to the Pandava camp. Yuyutsu fought the battle on the side of the Pandavas. He was one among the 11 Maharathis (capable of fighting 720,000 warriors simultaneously) among the son of Dhritarashtra. Yuyutsu was one among the eleven warriors to have survived the war. He had a few notable encounters. On the seventh day, he is wounded by Kripacharya in a sword fight but survives. On the Sixteenth day, he fights with Shakuni’s son Ulooka and wounds him, but fails to kill him as he flees.

After the War
When the Pandavas decided to retire from the world at the start of the Kali Yuga and departure of Krishna, Yudhishthira gave the charge of supervising the kingdom to Yuyutsu while Parikshit was made the king

Citations

Characters in the Mahabharata